Edin Murga (born 21 December 1994) is a Bosnian professional footballer who plays as a centre-forward, for First League of FBiH club TOŠK Tešanj.

Career
He joined GOŠK Gabela in September 2020. He left the club again in February 2021. Murga then joined Swiss 2. Liga Interregional club FC Portalban/Gletterens in July 2021.

Career statistics

Club

Honours
AEK Athens
Football League 2: 2013–14 (6th Group)

References

External links

1994 births
Living people
Sportspeople from Vicenza
Association football forwards
Bosnia and Herzegovina footballers
AEK Athens F.C. players
Vendsyssel FF players
Birkirkara F.C. players
Mosta F.C. players
FK Mladost Doboj Kakanj players
NK Bosna Visoko players
FK Tuzla City players
FK Zvijezda 09 players
NK GOŠK Gabela players
Gamma Ethniki players
Danish 1st Division players
Maltese Premier League players
First League of the Federation of Bosnia and Herzegovina players
Landesliga players
Premier League of Bosnia and Herzegovina players
Bosnia and Herzegovina expatriate footballers
Expatriate footballers in Greece
Bosnia and Herzegovina expatriate sportspeople in Greece
Expatriate men's footballers in Denmark
Bosnia and Herzegovina expatriate sportspeople in Denmark
Expatriate footballers in Malta
Bosnia and Herzegovina expatriate sportspeople in Malta
Expatriate footballers in Germany
Bosnia and Herzegovina expatriate sportspeople in Germany
Expatriate footballers in Switzerland
Bosnia and Herzegovina expatriate sportspeople in Switzerland
Footballers from Veneto